is a Japanese politician of the New Komeito Party, a member of the House of Representatives in the Diet (national legislature). A native of Arida District, Wakayama he attended University of Tokushima as both an undergraduate and graduate student and taught at a school in Wakayama from 1973 to 1992. In 1993, he was elected for the first time.

References

External links 
  in Japanese

1948 births
Living people
Members of the House of Representatives (Japan)
New Komeito politicians
21st-century Japanese politicians